Đoàn Thị Cách (born July 1, 1984) is a Vietnamese sprint canoer who competed in the mid-2000s. At the 2004 Summer Olympics in Athens, she was eliminated in the semifinals of the K-1 500 m event.

References

External links
 
Sports-Reference.com profile Đoàn Thị Cách 

1984 births
Canoeists at the 2004 Summer Olympics
Living people
Olympic canoeists of Vietnam
Vietnamese female canoeists
Canoeists at the 2006 Asian Games
Asian Games competitors for Vietnam
21st-century Vietnamese women